Shoot Loud, Louder... I Don't Understand is a 1966 Italian crime film directed by Eduardo De Filippo, who adapted the script from his play.

Plot
Alberto is a sculptor who sometimes has trouble separating his fantasies from reality. He shares a home in Naples with his Uncle Nicola. One night after meeting the beautiful Tania, he dreams that his neighbour, Amitrano, has been murdered by his family. He reports it to the police. Later he tells the police that he may have just imagined it but the police refuse to believe him, knowing that Amitrano was a gangster, and arrest him. Then Amitrano appears and demands Alberto's passport so he can escape to South America. Eventually Alberto and Tania flee from Naples.

Cast
 Marcello Mastroianni - Alberto Saporito
 Raquel Welch - Tania Montini
 Guido Alberti - Pasquale Cimmaruta
 Leopoldo Trieste - Carlo Saporito
 Tecla Scarano - Zia Rosa Cimmaruta
 Eduardo De Filippo - Zi Nicola
 Rosalba Grottesi - Elvira Cimmaruta
 Paolo Ricci - Aniello Amitrano
 Regina Bianchi - Rosa Amitrano (as Régina Bianchi)
 Franco Parenti - Chief Police Inspector
 Angela Luce - Beautiful Woman
 Silvano Tranquilli - Lt. Bertolucci
 Pina D'Amato - Matilde Cimmaruta
 Carlo Bagno - Marshal Bagnacavallo
 Pia Morra - Maid
 Gino Minopoli - Luigi Cimmaruta
 Alberto Bugli - Deputy Police Inspector
 Ignazio Spalla - Carmelo Vitiello

Production
The film was the first in a three-picture deal between Joe E. Levine and Marcello Mastroianni. Levine called the star "the most sought after personality today" and said he would earn "a lot more money than he's ever earned before." Levine said the title of the new movie "was thought up... on the spot... This is an age of titles," said Levine of the film's title.

Levine reportedly provided $1,350,000 of the budget. Welch's fee was $65,000 and Mastroianni got $600,000.

It was shot on location in Naples and at Rome's Cinecitta Studios in September 1966. It was one of the first notable roles for Raquel Welch, who at that stage was best known for her photographs in magazines than her acting. "Raquel has turned out to be very good, especially for comedy," said Mastroianni. "And comedy is much more difficult than drama."

Reception
The Los Angeles Times said the film was "as appetizing as a piece of stale pre-fab pizza... lengthy and boring... never were so many fireworks set off in such a dud of a movie.". The Chicago Tribune called it a "tedious and terrible mess... a disastrous dud."

References

External links

page for film at TCMDB

1966 films
Italian crime drama films
Films scored by Nino Rota
1960s Italian-language films
1966 crime films
Films based on works by Eduardo De Filippo
Films directed by Eduardo De Filippo
Films with screenplays by Suso Cecchi d'Amico
1960s Italian films